The Deutsche Reichsbahn's Class 05 was a German class of three express passenger steam locomotives of 4-6-4 wheel arrangement in the Whyte notation, or 2′C2′ h3 in the UIC notation used in continental Europe. They were part of the DRG's standard locomotive (Einheitslokomotive) series.

Pre World War II history 

Since the success of the diesel high speed trains like the Flying Hamburger in the middle of the 1930s, the German locomotive industry turned to faster steam locomotives. After speed tests with a streamlined DRG Class 03 the Borsig locomotive factories produced three engines:
 05 001 as streamlined in 1935
 05 002 as streamlined in 1935; This engine broke the world speed record in 1936 at 124.5 mph (200.4 km/h)
 05 003 as cab forward streamlined in 1937 

The locomotives did regular service in FD express passenger trains, e.g. FD 23 from Hamburg to Berlin. 
The design speed was 175 km/h (109 mph). In 1944, the streamline plates were removed. 05 003 had been rebuilt and lost the cab forward design.

World high speed records 
05 001 and 05 002 were mainly used for test runs from 1935 to 1936. Most of these runs were made on complete journeys between Hamburg and Berlin. On 7 June 1935 the 05 002 made a top speed of  near Berlin. On 11 May 1936 it set the world speed record for steam locomotives after reaching  on the Berlin–Hamburg line hauling a  train. The engine power was more than ). This record was broken two years later by the British LNER Class A4 4468 Mallard engine, on a slightly downhill line but with a heavier (240 ton) train. This record was set between Little Bytham and Essendine in South Lincolnshire.

On 30 May 1936 the 05 002 set an unbroken start stop speed record for steam locomotives: During the return run from a 190 km/h test Berlin-Hamburg it did the ~ from Wittenberge to a signal stop before Berlin-Spandau in 48 min 32 s, meaning  average between start and stop.

Post-War history 
After World War II, the three engines came to the engine shop in Hamm, Westphalia. Since there were only three specimens of the 05, DB thought to scrap them. But then the engines were sent to Krauss-Maffei to be restored. 05 003 went into regular service in 1950, the other two in 1951. All three locomotives were used to haul express trains until 1958.

Mostly the 05 hauled the FD (long-distance express) trains "Hanseat" and "Domspatz" on the run Hamburg - Cologne - Frankfurt. On this  run the 05 operated trains did the longest run with steam traction in the DB network. July 1958 the 05 were replaced by the diesel-hydraulic DB class V 200.

05 001 went to the Verkehrsmuseum Nürnberg, where it can be seen streamlined in large parts - the drivetrain on the right hand side remains visible - in its original red livery. The other two locomotives were scrapped in 1960.

Gallery

Notes

References

External links 
 https://web.archive.org/web/20070827054340/http://www.ewetel.net/~michael.blunck/ttd/br05_1.html
 http://www.dbtrains.com/en/locomotives/epochII/BR05
 http://www.dlok.de/87.htm Specifications source (in German)

05
4-6-4 locomotives
05
Borsig locomotives
Streamlined steam locomotives
Passenger locomotives
Standard gauge locomotives of Germany
Railway locomotives introduced in 1935
2′C2′ h3 locomotives